The debt service coverage ratio (DSCR), known as "debt coverage ratio" (DCR), is a financial metric used to assess an entity's ability to generate enough cash to cover its debt service obligations. These obligations include interest, principal, and lease payments. The DSCR is calculated by dividing the operating income available for debt service by the total amount of debt service due.

The DSCR is widely used as a benchmark to measure the ability of an individual or corporation to meet their debt obligations. A higher DSCR indicates that an entity has a greater ability to service their debts, making it easier for them to obtain loans. Banks and lenders often use a minimum DSCR ratio as a loan condition, and breaching this covenant can sometimes be considered an act of default. It's an important metric for measuring an entity's financial health and its ability to meet its debt obligations.

Uses
In corporate finance, DSCR refers to the amount of cash flow available to meet annual interest and principal payments on debt, including sinking fund payments.

In personal finance, DSCR refers to a ratio used by bank loan officers in determining debt servicing ability.

In commercial real estate finance, DSCR is the primary measure to determine if a property will be able to sustain its debt based on cash flow.  In the late 1990s and early 2000s banks typically required a DSCR of at least 1.2, but more aggressive banks would accept lower ratios, a risky practice that contributed to the Financial crisis of 2007–2010.  A DSCR over 1 means that (in theory, as calculated to bank standards and assumptions) the entity generates sufficient cash flow to pay its debt obligations. A DSCR below 1.0 indicates that there is not enough cash flow to cover loan payments. In certain industries where non-recourse project finance is used, a Debt Service Reserve Account is commonly used to ensure that loan repayment can be met even in periods with DSCR<1.0

Calculation
In general, it is calculated by:

where:

To calculate an entity's debt coverage ratio, you first need to determine the entity's net operating income (NOI). NOI is the difference between gross revenue and operating expenses. NOI is meant to reflect the true income of an entity or an operation without or before financing. Thus, not included in operating expenses are financing costs (e.g. interests from loans), personal income tax of owners/investors, capital expenditure and depreciation. 

Debt Service are costs and payments related to financing. Interests and lease payments are true costs resulting from taking loans or borrowing assets. Paying down the principal of a loan does not change the net equity/liquidation value of an entity; however, it reduces the cash an entity processes (in exchange of decreasing loan liability or increasing equity in an asset). Thus, by accounting for principal payments, DSCR reflects the cash flow situation of an entity.

For example, if a property has a debt coverage ratio of less than one, the income that property generates is not enough to cover the mortgage payments and the property's operating expenses. A property with a debt coverage ratio of .8 only generates enough income to pay for 80 percent of the yearly debt payments. However, if a property has a debt coverage ratio of more than 1, the property does generate enough income to cover annual debt payments. For example, a property with a debt coverage ratio of 1.5 generates enough income to pay all of the annual debt expenses, all of the operating expenses and actually generates fifty percent more income than is required to pay these bills.

A DSCR of less than 1 would mean a negative cash flow. A DSCR of less than 1, say .95,  would mean that there is only enough net operating income to cover 95% of annual debt payments. For example, in the context of personal finance, this would mean that the borrower would have to delve into his or her personal funds every month to keep the project afloat. Generally, lenders frown on a negative cash flow, but some allow it if the borrower has strong outside income.

Example
The debt coverage ratio for this property would be 1.2 and Mr. Jones would know the property generates 20 percent more than is required to pay the annual mortgage payment.

The Debt Service Ratio is also typically used to evaluate the quality
of a portfolio of mortgages.  For example, on June 19, 2008, a popular
US rating agency, Standard & Poors, reported that it lowered its credit
rating on several classes of pooled commercial mortgage pass-through
certificates originally issued by Bank of America.  The rating agency
stated in a press release that it had lowered the credit ratings of
four certificates in the Bank of America Commercial Mortgage Inc.
2005-1 series, stating that the downgrades "reflect the credit
deterioration of the pool".  They further go on to state that this
downgrade resulted from the fact that eight specific loans in the
pool have a debt service coverage (DSC) below 1.0x, or below one
times.

The Debt Service Ratio, or debt service coverage, provides a useful
indicator of financial strength.  Standard & Poors reported that
the total pool consisted, as of June 10, 2008, of 135 loans, with
They indicate that
there were, as of that date, eight loans with a DSC of lower than
1.0x.  This means that the net funds coming in from rental of the
commercial properties are not covering the mortgage costs.  Now,
since no one would make a loan like this initially, a financial
analyst or informed investor will seek information on what the
rate of deterioration of the DSC has been.  You want to know not
just what the DSC is at a particular point in time, but also how
much it has changed from when the loan was last evaluated.  The
S&P press release tells us this.  
It indicates that of the eight loans which are "underwater", 
they have an average balance of 
million, and an average decline in DSC of 38% since the loans
were issued.

And there is still more.  Since there are a total of 135 loans in
the pool, and only eight of them are underwater, with a DSC of
less than 1, the obvious question is: what is the total DSC of the
entire pool of 135 loans?  The Standard and Poors press release
provides this number, indicating that the weighted average DSC
for the entire pool is 1.76 .  
Again, this is just a snapshot now.  
The key question that DSC can help you answer,
is this better or worse, from when all the loans in the pool were
first made?   The S&P press release provides this also, explaining
that the original weighted average DSC for the entire pool of 135
loans was 1.66 .

In this way, the DSC (debt service coverage) ratio provides a way to assess the financial quality, and the associated risk level, of this pool of loans, and shows the surprising result that despite some loans experiencing DSC below 1, the overall DSC of the entire pool has improved, from 1.66  to 1.76 .  This is pretty much what
a good loan portfolio should look like, with DSC improving over
time, as the loans are paid down, and a small percentage, in this
case 6%, experiencing DSC ratios below one times, suggesting that
for these loans, there may be trouble ahead.

And of course, just because the DSCR is less than 1 for some loans,
this does not necessarily mean they will default.

Pre-Tax Provision Method 

Income taxes present a special problem to DSCR calculation and interpretation. While, in concept, DSCR is the ratio of cash flow available for debt service to required debt service, in practice – because interest is a tax-deductible expense and principal is not – there is no one figure that represents an amount of cash generated from operations that is both fully available for debt service and the only cash available for debt service.

While  Earnings Before Interest, Taxes, Depreciation and Amortization (EBITDA) is an appropriate measure of a company's ability to make interest-only payments (assuming that expected change in working capital is zero), EBIDA (without the "T") is a more appropriate indicator of a company's ability to make required principal payments. Ignoring these distinctions can lead to DSCR values that overstate or understate a company's debt service capacity. The Pre-Tax Provision Method provides a single ratio that expresses overall debt service capacity reliably given these challenges.

Debt Service Coverage Ratio as calculated using the Pre-Tax Provision Method answers the following question: How many times greater was the company's EBITDA than its critical EBITDA value, where critical EBITDA is that which just covers its 
Interest obligations + Principal obligations + Tax Expense assuming minimum sufficient income + Other necessary expenditures not treated as accounting expenses, like dividends and CAPEX.

The DSCR calculation under the Pre-Tax Provision Method is 
,
where Pre-tax Provision for Post-tax Outlays is the amount of pretax cash that must be set aside to meet required post-tax outlays, i.e., 
CPLTD + (Unfinanced CAPEX) + Dividends. 
The provision can be calculated as follows:

If (noncash expenses depreciation) + (depletion) + (amortization) > (post-tax outlays), then
(Pretax provision for post-tax outlays) = (Post-tax outlays)

then the company can apply  of cash inflow from operations to post-tax outlays without paying taxes on that  cash inflow. In this case, the pretax cash that the borrower must set aside for post-tax outlays would simply be .

If (post-tax outlays) > (noncash expenses), then
(Pretax provision for post-tax outlays) = (Noncash expenses) + 

from operations directly against  of post-tax outlays without paying taxes on that  inflow, but the company must set aside 
(assuming a 35% income tax rate) to meet the remaining  of post-tax outlays. This company's pretax provision for post-tax outlays =  +  = .

See also
LLCR
Operating leverage
Project Finance

References

Financial ratios
Commercial real estate
Credit